Tell Serhan is an archaeological site 9 km southeast of Rayak Air Base, 4 km northeast of Bar Elias in the Beqaa Mohafazat (Governorate) in Lebanon. It dates at least to the Neolithic with middle and late Bronze Age materials plentiful.

References

Baalbek District
Neolithic settlements
Bronze Age sites in Lebanon